The 2012 BMW Malaysian Open was a women's tennis tournament played on outdoor hard courts. It was the third edition of the Malaysian Open and was an International tournament on the 2012 WTA Tour. The tournament took place from February 27 to March 4 at the Bukit Kiara Equestrian and Country Resort. Hsieh Su-wei won the singles title.

Singles main draw entrants

Seeds

1 Rankings are as of February 20, 2012

Other entrants
The following players received wildcards into the main draw:
  Jarmila Gajdošová
  Jelena Janković
  Olga Puchkova
  Agnieszka Radwańska

The following players received entry from the qualifying draw:
  Hsieh Su-wei
  Nudnida Luangnam
  Karolína Plíšková
  Kristýna Plíšková

Retirements
  Petra Martić (fatigue and cramping)
  Ayumi Morita (right shoulder injury)
  Agnieszka Radwańska (right elbow injury)

Doubles main draw entrants

Seeds

1 Rankings are as of February 20, 2012

Other entrants
The following pairs received wildcards into the doubles main draw:
  Elitsa Kostova /  Anne Kremer
  Hsieh Shu-ying /  Hsieh Su-wei

Finals

Singles

 Hsieh Su-wei defeated  Petra Martić 2–6, 7–5, 4–1 ret.
 It was Hsieh's 1st singles title of her career.

Doubles

 Chang Kai-chen /  Chuang Chia-jung defeated  Chan Hao-ching /  Rika Fujiwara 7–5, 6–4

External links
 Official website
 ITF tournament edition details

Malaysian Open
Malaysian Open (tennis)
2012 in Malaysian tennis